(born 25 January 1984 in Tokushima) is a Japanese table tennis player.

She competed at the 2008 Summer Olympics, reaching the third round of the singles competition. She also competed in the team competition, reaching the bronze medal final but losing to South Korea.

References

2008 Olympic profile

External links
ITTF Database

1984 births
Living people
Japanese female table tennis players
Table tennis players at the 2008 Summer Olympics
Olympic table tennis players of Japan
Table tennis players at the 2006 Asian Games
Universiade medalists in table tennis
Universiade silver medalists for Japan
Universiade bronze medalists for Japan
Asian Games competitors for Japan
Medalists at the 2007 Summer Universiade